"Budapest" is a song by English singer-songwriter George Ezra, from his debut studio album, Wanted on Voyage (2014). It was released as the album's second single on 13 December 2013 in Italy, and on 13 June 2014 in the United Kingdom. The song was co-written by Ezra with Joel Pott and produced by Cam Blackwood.

The single was released on Columbia Records, and distributed by Sony Music, and peaked at number three on the UK Singles Chart. "Budapest" has also been a major hit for Ezra in Austria, New Zealand, and Slovenia, topping the charts in all three countries, while reaching the top ten in eleven additional countries. It was the 10th-best-selling single of 2014 in the UK. The song was released in the U.S. in late 2014 and has peaked at number 32.

Background
Ezra told The Daily Telegraph that "Budapest" was "[his] first attempt to write a love song, and it uses the first three guitar chords [he] ever learned. There's a lot to be said for that simplicity." Ezra has also insisted that, despite its title, the lyrics of "Budapest" do not have anything to do with the city in Hungary and that he had never even been there before. He said, "I was in Malmö in Sweden and the Eurovision Song Contest was being held in Malmö on that night, and I didn't have a clue about it but everyone there seemed to be really excited about it and having parties. But I didn't know you couldn't buy alcohol after 10 o'clock at night. So I ended up buying a bottle of like, rum, or something like that from a guy in a park so I could have something to drink at this party. Anyway, I was meant to be getting a train to Budapest the next day, and I never got it because I was too hungover and didn't fancy it. So I wrote the song about being miles from Budapest."

"Budapest" was originally released as part of Ezra's EP Did You Hear the Rain?, which contains the song of the same name. When asked about how the song became popular, Ezra revealed, "At first we gave it away as a free track off the/my EP for like a month, and then in Italy it just kicked off for some reason. I've never even been over there, but [the song] was just huge on the radio. It kind of happened overnight. Then it went over [to] Germany and when we released it in the UK, it took off there as well."

Composition
With a tempo of 128 bpm, the song "Budapest" is composed in the key of F major.

Critical reception
Chris Willman of Billboard called it an "acoustically inclined, eminently hummable single".

Chart performance
In 2015, "Budapest" became a sleeper hit in the United States. It debuted at number 81 on the Billboard Hot 100 in February 2015, and peaked at number 32 in May.

Music video
An official music video for "Budapest" was first released onto YouTube on 21 April 2014. It consists of a large crowd of people all with different styles and accessories all standing motionless together in a tight-knit crowd, occasionally being inter-cut with footage of one of them doing something minor like shifting slightly where they stand, one of them sneezing gaining the attention of everyone around and George playing his guitar and singing to the camera with a smile. As the video goes on, the people start to move and interact by passing their accessories around, a group of three young men having one of them bite into a very spicy chili pepper, a party attendee in a sash and tiara talking on the phone to someone, the crowd looking up together and putting on 3-D glasses, all inter-cut with George crowd-surfing them and playing and singing to the camera again.

As the video starts to come to an end, George begins to crowd-surf standing up instead, taking off his guitar and passing it down to join all the other accessories being passed around, this time with people interacting more and dancing together. The video ends with George singing with his guitar standing in the again-motionless crowd; when the song ends he simply stops and becomes motionless too. In a small epilogue, some members of the crowd are all on the floor silently cheering, laughing and clapping together.

Formats and track listings
Digital download 
 "Budapest" – 3:20

CD single 
 "Budapest" – 3:23
 "Angry Hill" – 4:11

Charts

Weekly charts

Year-end charts

Decade-end charts

Certifications

Release history

References

External links

2013 singles
George Ezra songs
2013 songs
Songs about cities
Songs written by Joel Pott
Columbia Records singles
Songs written by George Ezra
Song recordings produced by Cam Blackwood